The Cali Explosion occurred on August 7, 1956, in downtown Cali, Colombia. It was caused by the explosion of seven army ammunition trucks loaded with 1053 boxes of dynamite, which were parked in Cali overnight. In 1956, the city of Cali had around 400,000 inhabitants. More than 1,300 died from the explosion, and another 4,000 were wounded. Some estimate go as high as 4000 deaths and 12000 injured.

Events 

Seven army trucks, loaded with 1053 boxes of dynamite, came from Buenaventura and were parked in an old railway station. The explosion occurred in the early hours of the morning - destroying 41 blocks and leaving a crater 50 meters wide and 25 meters deep. The blast destroyed buildings, homes and businesses, killing more than 1,300 people and injuring more than 4,000. Six districts were affected: San Nicolás, El Porvenir, El Hoyo, El Piloto, Fátima and Jorge Isaacs.

The blast caused an earthquake with a magnitude of 4.3. The noise was heard in Buga, Palmira, Santander de Quilichao, Caloto and Jamundí.

Hypotheses at the time for the explosion include trucks overheating or a soldier accidentally firing his gun. The incident occurred while Gustavo Rojas Pinilla was president. He attributed the tragedy to the opposition, who had recently signed the Benidorm covenant.

Reactions 

In the early hours following the explosion, priest Alfonso Hurtado Galvis intervened. He said of the incident: "the mushroom cloud left by the explosion resembled that formed by the atomic bombings of Hiroshima and Nagasaki, but smaller in proportion ... mutilated body parts including legs, arms, torsos could be seen. The scene was horrific.. dead and wounded everywhere."

In the central cemetery 3725 skulls and body parts were buried in a mass grave. An iron cross near streets 25 and 26 was erected to commemorate the incident.

Following the tragedy, local Colombian organizations such as the Red Cross, the Sendas organization (Department of Social Welfare and Child Protection, later the Colombian Institute of Family Welfare (Instituto Colombiano de Bienestar Familiar), the Boy Scouts and the Sisters of Charity and clergy offered help. The Holy See, then headed by Pope Pius XII, the Soviet Union, the Kingdom of Afghanistan, the Palhavi dynasty of Iran (Persia), Vietnam, the Kingdom of Laos, the Philippines, North Korea, the United States, Canada, Mexico, Venezuela,  the Mongolian People's Republic, South Korea, Japan, China and Europe sympathised with the victims.

Popular culture 
 Bloody Flesh (Spanish: Carne de tu carne, "Flesh of Your Flesh") is a 1983 Colombian drama horror film written and directed by Carlos Mayolo based on the explosion.

References 

Explosions in 1956
Cali
1956 in Colombia
August 1956 events in South America